Edward John "Ted" Pierce (born 3 July 1933) is an Australian water polo player who competed at three Olympic Games.

He competed at the 1956 Melbourne, 1960 Rome and the 1964 Tokyo Olympics.

References

External links
 Profile at Australian Olympic Committee

1933 births
Living people
Australian male water polo players
Olympic water polo players of Australia
Water polo players at the 1956 Summer Olympics
Water polo players at the 1960 Summer Olympics
Water polo players at the 1964 Summer Olympics
20th-century Australian people